Blue butterfly may refer to:

Butterflies
 Lycaenidae, a family of butterflies
 Polyommatinae, a subfamily consisting of the blue butterflies
 Common blue (Polyommatus icarus)
 Large blue (Phengaris arion)
 Small blue (Cupido minimus)
 Euphilotes, a subfamily consisting of blue butterflies
 El Segundo Blue (Euphilotes battoides)
 Blue morpho (disambiguation), several species in the genus Morpho

Other uses
 The Blue Butterfly, Canadian film
 Blue Butterfly (album), JPOP album

See also
 
 

Animal common name disambiguation pages